Tauati Tanoa'i (born 19 April 1998) is a Samoan professional footballer who plays for Lupe o le Soaga and the Samoa national team.

International career
Tanoa'i first played on the international stage at the 2015 OFC U-17 Championship. He next appeared for the Samoa U20s at the 2016 OFC U-20 Championship held in Tonga, where he played in all three preliminary round matches. He also appeared for the Samoa U23s at the 2019 OFC Men's Olympic Qualifying Tournament.

In June 2019 he was named to the squad for the 2019 Pacific Games. He made his senior international debut on 8 July 2019, replacing Ritchievoy Ueligitone during their 6–0 group stage defeat to Papua New Guinea.

Career statistics

International

References

External links
 
 

Living people
1998 births
Samoan footballers
Samoa international footballers
Samoa under-20 international footballers
Samoa youth international footballers
Association football defenders